Eight Girls in a Boat may refer to:

 Eight Girls in a Boat  (1932 film), a 1932 German film directed by Erich Waschneck
 Eight Girls in a Boat (1934 film), a 1934 American film directed by  Richard Wallace